Captain Augustus Leveson-Gower (21 June 1782 – 3 August 1802) served in the Royal Navy during the French Revolutionary war.

Career 

He was commissioned as a Lieutenant on 11 January 1800. He was commissioned as a Commander on 20 October 1801. He died aged 20 at Port Royal, Jamaica.

Family 

Augustus Leveson-Gower was the son of Admiral the Hon. John Leveson-Gower (1740–1792) by his wife Frances Boscawen. Admiral John was the son of John Leveson-Gower, 1st Earl Gower and Mary Tufton. Frances Boscawen was the eldest daughter of Admiral the Hon. Edward Boscawen and Frances Glanville. Augustus Leveson-Gower died unmarried, without issue and was survived by his mother and all brothers and sisters.

References

External links

1781 births
1802 deaths
Royal Navy officers
Royal Navy personnel of the French Revolutionary Wars
Augustus Leveson-Gower (1781-1802), Captain, drowned